Thaxterogaster argyrionus is a species of sequestrate (truffle-like) fungus in the family Cortinariaceae. Described as a new species in 2010, it is known only from New South Wales.

Taxonomy
The species was first described scientifically by Australian mycologists Melissa Danks, Teresa Lebel, and Karl Verns in a 2010 issue of the journal Persoonia. The type collection was made in Armidale, New South Wales in July 2008. Molecular analysis shows that the species groups in a clade with species in the section Purpurascentes of the genus Cortinarius, along with the sequestrate C. caesibulga and C. cinereoroseolus, and the agarics C. porphyropus and C. purpurascens.  The specific epithet argyrionus is derived from the Ancient Greek word meaning "silvery violet", and refers to the sheen and colour of the fruit bodies.

In 2022 the species was transferred from Cortinarius and reclassified as Thaxterogaster argyrionus based on genomic data.

Description
The fruit body of Thaxterogaster argyrionus is sequestrate, meaning that its spores are not forcibly discharged from the basidia, and it remains enclosed during all stages of development, including at maturity. Caps are attached to the stipe by a cottony partial veil that is initially violet before becoming paler in maturity. The outer skin (pellis) is wrinkled, and coloured pale violet to silvery-grey, with a metallic sheen. The internal hymenium-bearing structure (hymenophore) is brown. Fruit bodies have no distinctive taste, but possess an odour the authors describe as "strong earthy fungoid". Spores are egg-shaped, and typically measure 7.7–9 by 5–6.5 μm. They are densely covered with nodules that extend up to 1.5 μm high. The basidia (spore-bearing cells) are club-shaped to cylindrical, four-spored, and measure 20–40 by 5–7 μm.

Habitat and distribution
The fruit bodies of Thaxterogaster argyrionus are found in the ground under leaf litter in low-lying hills and plains near Mount Duval. They occur in June and July and grow in large clusters, sometimes with the fruit bodies clumped together. Nearby vegetation associated with the fungus typically includes Acacia filicifolia, Eucalyptus nova-anglica, E. stellulata, E. viminalis, Hakea microcarpa, H. salicifolia and Leptospermum flavescens.

See also
List of Cortinarius species

References

External links

argyrionus
Fungi described in 2010
Fungi of Australia
Taxa named by Teresa Lebel